Chinaplas is an Asian trade show for the plastics and rubber industries.

History 
Chinaplas is currently the largest international trade fair for the plastics and rubber in Asia and the second largest in the world after K Fair, Germany.

The exhibition was founded in 1983. Chinaplas has become a sourcing and networking platform for the plastics and rubber industries and has contributed to their development.

Chinaplas has been certified as a "UFI Approved Event" by Union des Foires Internationales, the Global Association of the Exhibition Industry.

Show Scale for the coming edition (Chinaplas 2018) 
 Exhibition Area: 320,000 sqm
 No. of Exhibitors: 3,400+
 Expected No. of Trade Visitors: 150,000+
 No. of Machinery Exhibits: 3,800+
 11 Country/ Region Pavilions: Austria, Canada, China, France, Germany, Italy, Japan, Switzerland, Taiwan, UK, USA
 17 Theme Zones
- Injection Molding Machinery Zone

- Extrusion Machinery Zone

- Plastic Packaging Machinery Zone

- Film Technology Zone

- Rubber Machinery Zone

- Smart Manufacturing Technology Zone

- 3D Technology Zone

- Auxiliary & Testing Equipment Zone

- Die & Mould Zone

- Recycling technology Zone

- Chemical & Raw Materials Zone

- Additives Zone

- Bioplastics Zone

- Colour Pigment & Masterbatch Zone

- Composite & High Performance Materials Zone

- Semi-Finished Products Zone

- Chinese Export Machinery & Materials Halls

Events
Chinaplas 2018 (The 32nd International Exhibition on Plastics and Rubber Industries) - 24–27 April 2018, National Exhibition and Convention Center,  Hongqiao (NECC), Shanghai, PR China 
Chinaplas 2017 (The 31st International Exhibition on Plastics and Rubber Industries) - 16–19 May 2017, China Import and Export Fair Pazhou Complex, Pazhou, Guangzhou, PR China
Chinaplas 2016 (The 30th International Exhibition on Plastics and Rubber Industries) -  25–28 April 2016, Shanghai New International Expo Centre (SNIEC), PR China
Chinaplas 2015 (The 29th International Exhibition on Plastics and Rubber Industries) - 20–23 May 2015, China Import and Export Fair Pazhou Complex, Pazhou, Guangzhou, PR China
Chinaplas 2014 (The 28th International Exhibition on Plastics and Rubber Industries) -  23–26 April 2014, Shanghai New International Expo Centre (SNIEC), PR China
Chinaplas 2013 (The 27th International Exhibition on Plastics and Rubber Industries) - 20–23 May 2013, China Import and Export Fair Pazhou Complex, Pazhou, Guangzhou, PR China

References

External links
 Chinaplas 2019 (video)
 Chinaplas official website

Trade fairs in China